Glutamate receptor, ionotropic, N-methyl D-aspartate-like 1B, also known as GRINL1B, is a human gene. The protein encoded by this gene is a subunit of the NMDA receptor.

References

External links 
 

Ionotropic glutamate receptors